Angélica de Almeida (born March 25, 1965) is a retired marathon runner from Brazil, who won the 1986 edition of the Buenos Aires Marathon. She represented her native country in the women's marathon at the 1988 Summer Olympics in Seoul, South Korea, finishing in 44th place.

Achievements
All results regarding marathon, unless stated otherwise

References
 sports-reference

1965 births
Living people
Brazilian female long-distance runners
Athletes (track and field) at the 1988 Summer Olympics
Olympic athletes of Brazil
21st-century Brazilian women
20th-century Brazilian women